The Strathmore Wheatland Kings are a junior ice hockey team from Strathmore, Alberta, Canada.  They compete in the Heritage Junior B Hockey League and are eligible to compete for the Russ Barnes Trophy and the Keystone Cup.

History
The team was formed in 2008 and applied for a spot in the Heritage Junior B Hockey League for the 2008-2009 season. They were accepted and began to play in the league in September 2008. The franchise requested and were granted a leave of absence for the 2013-2014 season in order to re-organize.  An agreement with Strathmore Minor Hockey (SMHA) paved the way for the team to return to the heritage league for the 2014-2015 season.

Season-by-season standings

References

External links
Wheatland Kings website
Heritage League website

Ice hockey teams in Alberta
2008 establishments in Alberta
Ice hockey clubs established in 2008
Wheatland County, Alberta